The Eagle, founded in 1859, is the annual review of St John's College, Cambridge.

The poet Thomas Ashe founded The Eagle in the year in which he graduated from St John's., with the help of a college fellow, Joseph Bickersteth Mayor. Henry George Hart (1843–1921) and Robert Forsyth Scott (1849–1933) were later editors of the magazine.

Samuel Butler wrote for The Eagle.

History
 1859-1935 : Published by W. Metcalfe 
 1959- : Published annually by St. John's College 

Since 1981, a supplement has also been published. 

Between 1889 and 1915, some of the records from the Cambridge Archives were printed in the magazine.

References

External links
 
 The Eagle at HathiTrust

1859 establishments in England
Annual magazines published in the United Kingdom
Magazines established in 1859
St John's College, Cambridge
Mass media in Cambridge
Alumni magazines